The Pender-Topsail Post & Voice is  an American, English language community newspaper based in Burgaw North Carolina.  It has a circulation of approximately 5000.  The Pender Post, which began publication in the 1971, purchased the Topsail Voice in March, 2012. and is now known as the Pender Topsail Post & Voice.   The Post & Voice purchased the Pender Chronicle in September 2012 and retired the name of the county's oldest newspaper.  The Post & Voice provides coverage of news, sports, features, and events exclusively for Pender County.

History
Previous papers that are now part of the Pender Topsail Post & Voice:
 The Pender Post. (Burgaw, N.C.) 1971–2012, OCLC 28598394
 Topsail Voice. (Hampstead, N.C.) 1991–2012, OCLC 32600106
 Pender Chronicle (Burgaw, Pender County, N.C.) 190?-2012, OCLC 13247075

North Carolina Press Association Journalism Awards
The Pender-Topsail Post & Voice is a member of the North Carolina Press Association:
 2010, General Excellence, North Carolina Press Association

See also
 List of newspapers in North Carolina

References

Weekly newspapers published in North Carolina
Pender County, North Carolina